This is a list of lighthouses in Palestine.

Lighthouses

See also
 Lists of lighthouses and lightvessels

References

External links
 

Palestine
Lighthouses